The 1980 All-Pacific-10 Conference football team consists of American football players chosen by various organizations for All-Pacific-10 Conference teams for the 1980 NCAA Division I-A football season.

Offensive selections

Quarterbacks
 John Elway, Stanford (AP-1)
 Tom Flick, Washington (AP-2)

Running backs
 Marcus Allen, USC (AP-1)
 Freeman McNeil, UCLA (AP-1)
 Darrin Nelson, Stanford (AP-1)
 Willie Gittens, Arizona St. (AP-2)
 Tony Robinson, Oregon St. (AP-2)
 Toussaint Tyler, Washington (AP-2)

Wide receivers
 Ken Margerum, Stanford (AP-1)
 Andre Tyler, Stanford (AP-1)
 John Mistler, Arizona St. (AP-2)
 Cormac Carney, UCLA (AP-2)

Tight ends
 Tim Wrightman, UCLA (AP-1)
 Hoby Brenner, USC (AP-2)

Tackles
Keith Van Horne, USC (AP-1)
 Brian Holloway, Stanford (AP-1)
 Randy Van Divier, Washington (AP-2)
 Bill Jensen, Arizona (AP-2)

Guards
 Larry Lee, UCLA (AP-1)
Roy Foster, USC (AP-1)
Greg Sykes, Washington St. (AP-2)
John Tautolo, UCLA (AP-2)

Centers
John Macauley, Stanford (AP-1)
Roger Levasa, Oregon St. (AP-2)

Defensive selections

Linemen
 Irv Eatman, UCLA (AP-1)
Vince Goldsmith, Oregon (AP-1)
Dennis Edwards, USC (AP-1)
George Achica, USC (AP-1)
Mike Robinson, Arizona (AP-2)
Fletcher Jenkins, Washington (AP-2)
Mark Jerue, Washington (AP-2)
Rusty Olsen, Washington (AP-2)

Linebackers
 Avon Riley, UCLA (AP-1)
Chip Banks, USC (AP-1)
Vernon Maxwell, Arizona St. (AP-1)
Rich Dixon, California (AP-1)
Riki Gray, USC (AP-2)
Bryan Hinkle, Oregon (AP-2)
Milt McColl, Stanford (AP-2)
Mark Stewart, Washington (AP-2)

Defensive backs
 Kenny Easley, UCLA (AP-1)
 Dennis Smith, USC (AP-1)
Ronnie Lott, USC (AP-1)
Dave Liggins, Arizona (AP-1)
Marcellus Greene, Arizona (AP-2)
Lupe Sanchez, UCLA (AP-2)
Ron Coccimiglio, California (AP-2)
Mike Richardson, Arizona St. (AP-2)

Special teams

Placekickers
Chuck Nelson, Washington (AP-1)
Mick Luckhurst, California (AP-2)

Punters
 Mike Black, Arizona St. (AP-1)
 Sergio Vega, Arizona (AP-2)

Return specialists 
 Willie Gittens, Arizona St. (AP-1)
 Ken Gardner, Washington (AP-2)

Key

AP = Associated Press

See also
1980 College Football All-America Team

References

All-Pacific-10 Conference Football Team
All-Pac-12 Conference football teams